Aghbazh is a town in the Federally Administered Tribal Areas of Pakistan. It is located at 31°32'33N 69°59'17E with an altitude of 2239 metres (7349 feet).

References

Populated places in Khyber Pakhtunkhwa